Taqdeer  (Destiny, Fate) is a 1943 Indian Hindi language comedy film. It was directed by Mehboob Khan under his Mehboob Productions banner. The star cast included a young Nargis in her first lead role along with Motilal, Chandra Mohan, Charlie, Jilloobai and Kayam Ali. 

Written by Ghulam Mohammed, the screenplay and dialogue were by Agha Jani Kashmiri. Its music was composed by Rafiq Ghaznavi and the lyrics credited to Meharul Qadri. The story is a romantic comedy based on the lost and found formula set against an entertaining backdrop. It was the ninth-highest-grossing Indian film of 1943.

Cast 
Motilal as Babu
Chandramohan as Judge Jumnaprasad
Charlie as Seth
Nargis as Shyama
Jilloobai as Judge's wife
Kayamali
Ansari as Stage actor
Laddan
Maheshar Shirazi

Story 
Badriprasad (Charlie) a widower, is in the theatre business and is staging a play at a fair (the Kumbh Mela). His manager Ghanshyam, tells him that Pappu, Badriprasad's young son, is lost. They look for him but cannot find him. The manager instead finds a little girl, Shyama, who seems lost. He and his wife, being childless, decide to bring her up as their daughter.  Judge Jumna Prasad (Chandra Mohan), who is also at the fair, is unable to find his daughter Shyama and tries searching for her with the help of the police.  The judge's wife loses her mental balance when she hears about her missing daughter. The doctor says that she is in danger of losing her life too if Shyama is not found soon.  The judge's servant finds Pappu and tells the judge to dress the boy in Shyama's clothes and pretend the boy is Shyama to save his wife's life. Thereafter, the judge's wife continues to believe that Pappu is Shyama in spite of seeing him dressed as a boy even after he grows up. She insists on him calling him "beti" (daughter).

Badriprasad loses all interest in his theatre after the loss of his son. His manager Ghanshyam encourages him to revive the theatre. Badriprasad sees the little Shyama dancing and asks the manager about her. By now Ghanshyam's wife has died and he lets Badriprasad adopt the little girl. Shyama (Nargis) grows up in the theatre milieu as Badriprasad's daughter and is also the main cast in their theatre productions.

Pappu, now called Babu (Motilal) visits the theatre with his parents. He is enamoured of Shyama and soon both fall in love. The judge refuses to allow the marriage as he considers theatre people below his social standing. Babu finds out that he is not the judge's real son and leaves home. The judge's wife regains her memory following the shock of Babu leaving the house. Disagreements are sorted out once the lost identities of Shyama and Babu are discovered.

Trivia 
This was Nargis Dutt's debut film as a heroine. She was about 14 years old to Motilal's 33 years when she agreed to act in this film. She had earlier acted as a child artist in her mother's (Jaddan Bai) films by the name of Baby Rani. Nargis's real name was Fatima, but Mehboob Khan didn't think it suited her, and so for the film changed it to Nargis. She got good reviews for the film with Filmindia calling it "a brilliant screen debut".

Box office 
Taqdeer was appreciated by the critics as well as the people. It was a success and was the ninth highest grossing film of 1943.

Music 
The music was composed by Rafiq Ghaznavi and though the film credits one lyricist Meharul Qadri, there were two other lyricists, namely Anjum Pilibhiti and Agha Mahshar Shirazi. The songs for Nargis were sung by Shamshad Begum, while Motilal sang his own songs. There are a couple of songs with patriotic fervour denoting the pre-independent era the film was made in. The first was "Badle Jo Zamaane Ki Taqdeer Hamari Hai" and the second was "Meri Mata Meri Mata, Bharat Mata".

References

External links 
 
 Taqdeer (1943) on indiancine.ma

1943 films
1940s Hindi-language films
Films directed by Mehboob Khan
Indian drama films
Indian black-and-white films
1943 drama films
Hindi-language drama films